1625 Eye Street is a high-rise  building located in Washington, D.C., United States. Its construction began in 2001 and was completed in 2003. The construction of this building replaced the Cafritz Building, which also used the same address as this building. The original architect of the building was Skidmore, Owings & Merrill (Washington), who designed the postmodern concept of the building. Gensler repositioned the design and ultimately completed the documentation, permitting and construction administration of the building. The material of the postmodern design includes steel and glass. The building serves as an office use building and as a parking garage. The building is operated by American Real Estate Partners. The building was originally operated and developed by Union Labor Life Insurance Company, though in late 2003, Skidmore, Owings, & Merrill (Washington) bought the operations to the building for $157 million.

The building's tenants include CQ Roll Call, Colliers International, the Consumer Healthcare Products Association, and O'Melveny & Myers.

See also
List of tallest buildings in Washington, D.C.

References

Office buildings completed in 2003
Skyscraper office buildings in Washington, D.C.
Brookfield Properties buildings
Skidmore, Owings & Merrill buildings
2003 establishments in Washington, D.C.